Lee Anthony Humphrey (born April 23, 1984) is an American-born professional basketball player, who last played for BC Juventus of the Lithuanian League. Humphrey played college basketball for the University of Florida, and was a key member of the Florida Gators teams that won back-to-back NCAA national championships in 2006 and 2007.  He set both the season and career records at Florida for three-point field goals, making 113 in back-to-back seasons and 288 in his college career.

Early years

Humphrey was born in Maryville, Tennessee in 1984. He attended Maryville High School, where he played high school basketball for the Maryville Rebels.  As a senior, he was named Tennessee's Class AAA Mr. Basketball for the 2002–03 season after averaging 27.6 points, 8.0 rebounds and 7.0 assists.

College career

Humphrey accepted an athletic scholarship to attend the University of Florida in Gainesville, Florida, and he played for coach Billy Donovan's Florida Gators men's basketball team from 2003 to 2007.  He emerged as a prolific weapon from outside the arc during the 2005–06 season in which he hit several clutch three-pointers, including three in the Final Four against George Mason and the championship game against UCLA.  The 73–57 win over UCLA was the clincher of Florida's first national basketball championship.  The Gators finished the season with a 33–6 mark.

Humphrey's dominance continued during the 2006–07 campaign and with the other members of the starting five returning, the Gators rolled to a 35–5 record.  On March 23, 2007, in the St. Louis regional NCAA tournament game against the Oregon Ducks, the game was delayed 10 minutes after a three-point shot Humphrey made damaged the net. During the 2007 Final Four, he hit four three-point shots in his team's 76–66 victory against UCLA in becoming the record holder for most three-pointers made during the NCAA tournament, surpassing former Duke star Bobby Hurley. On April 2, 2007, he won a second NCAA basketball championship with the Florida Gators, scoring 14 points in an 84–75 victory over the Ohio State Buckeyes. This win established Florida as the first team to repeat as NCAA basketball champions since Duke, in 1991 and 1992.

Humphrey was also a proven academic success, becoming just the second Gators basketball player to be named a first-team Academic All-American. Humphrey also served as the President of the Fellowship of Christian Athletes Chapter at the University of Florida.  He graduated from the university with a bachelor of science degree in applied physiology and kinesiology in 2007.

Statistics

Records 

NCAA Basketball 
Most made 3-point field goals NCAA tournament play: 55 in 14 games
Most consecutive games making a 3-point field goal in a season: 39 games from 11/14/06-4/2/07

Florida Basketball
Most 3-point field goals in a season: 113 in both the 2005–2006 and 2006–2007 seasons
Most 3-point field goals in a career: 288

Professional career 

On June 30, 2007, Humphrey accepted an offer from the Washington Wizards to participate in their summer league but was cut.  He then crossed the Atlantic, signing on with PAOK, one of Greece's best-known club teams. When the team signed a third American player, Humphrey was cut due to league rules that limit team rosters to two American players. He spent the second half of the 2007–2008 season in Poland playing for Energa Czarni, but saw limited minutes. In July 2008, Humphrey signed a one-year contract with Ratiopharm Ulm, a south German team playing in the Basketball Bundesliga (first German division). After spending the 2011–12 season in the NBA Developmental League, he signed with Denain of France's second-tier league. On December 27, 2014, he signed with BC Juventus of the Lithuanian League. On January 7, 2015, he left Juventus due to back issues. He played 2 games averaging 6 points.

Personal life 
Humphrey is married to his college sweetheart Chelsea, and father to sons Oliver (4 in 2018) and Jude (18 months in 2018)  After retirement from professional basketball, he joined Pontoon Solutions in 2015, where he became the Sales Director in April 2021. He also has received his Master of Business Administration from Florida International University – College of Business in 2015. In the 2021–22 NCAA men's basketball season, Humphrey has performed as an analyst for the radio broadcasts of Florida Gator men's basketball games.

See also 

 2005–06 Florida Gators men's basketball team
 2006–07 Florida Gators men's basketball team
 Florida Gators

References

External links 
 Kansas City Star article about Lee
 Article about his free-throw shooting difficulties
 University of Florida NCAA athlete profile
 ESPN Player Profile
 Lee Humphrey

1984 births
Living people
Alba Fehérvár players
American expatriate basketball people in France
American expatriate basketball people in Germany
American expatriate basketball people in Greece
American expatriate basketball people in Hungary
American expatriate basketball people in Lithuania
American expatriate basketball people in Poland
American expatriate basketball people in Ukraine
American men's basketball players
Basketball players from Tennessee
BC Juventus players
BC Kyiv players
Czarni Słupsk players
Denain Voltaire Basket players
Florida Gators men's basketball players
P.A.O.K. BC players
People from Maryville, Tennessee
Point guards
Ratiopharm Ulm players
Rio Grande Valley Vipers players
Shooting guards